The 1st constituency of Haute-Saône is a French legislative constituency in the Haute-Saône département. Like the other 576 French constituencies, it elects one MP using a two round electoral system.

Description

The 1st constituency of Haute-Saône is centred on the small town of Vesoul and covers the western portion of the department. The borders of the constituency crested for the 2012 election match those of the old 1st Constituency which existed between 1958 and 1986 after which
Haute-Saône had three constituencies before reverting to two in 2012.

Until 2017 the constituency had elected conservative representatives throughout the Fifth Republic.

Historic Representation

Election results

2022

 
 
 
|-
| colspan="8" bgcolor="#E9E9E9"|
|-

2017

 
 
 
 
 
 
 
|-
| colspan="8" bgcolor="#E9E9E9"|
|-

2012

 
 
 
 
 
 
|-
| colspan="8" bgcolor="#E9E9E9"|
|-

Sources

Official results of French elections from 2002: "Résultats électoraux officiels en France" (in French).

1